Engineering Drawing by Thomas Ewing French (1871-1944), Mech. Eng., OSU 1895, also known as A Manual of Engineering Drawing for Students and Draftsman, was first published in 1911 by McGraw-Hill Book Company. It appeared in fourteen editions and was last published in 1993. The title and author remained the same through the first six editions. French died during the publication years of the Sixth Edition, so the Seventh Edition was revised by his colleague at Ohio State University, Charles J. Vierck. The Eighth through Tenth editions had the same title and were also authored by Charles J. Vierck. For the Eleventh and Twelfth editions, the book title changed to Engineering Drawing and Graphic Technology. Following the death of Vierck in 1980, the Thirteenth and Fourteenth Editions were additionally authored by Robert J. Foster, Penn State University.

In North America, this textbook was widely used for education of drafters, engineers, and architects.

History 
It was during the year 1910 that Martin M. Foss, a traveling representative of the newly organized McGraw-Hill Book Company, in calling on the Department of Engineering Drawing, recognized in the group headed by Professor Thomas E. French one of the most successful and talented groups in its field in the United States. He said to Professor French: "We want a new mechanical drawing text. " "There are already fifty drawing books on the market" protested French. "But which is standard?" countered Foss. "We want a text that will be widely accepted as the standard work on the subject." Professor French accepted the challenge. Discarding the time-worn name "Mechanical Drawing" he coined a new title and wrote a text, "A Manual of Engineering Drawing for Students and Draftsmen", which was published in 1911. He was ably assisted by Assistant Professor Robert Meiklejohn, Instructors Owen E. Williams, Arthur C. Harper, Cree Sheets, Frederick W. Ives, William D. Turnbull and William J. Norris, which were the entire teaching staff of the department. The staff contributed immeasurably in the preparation of drawings, problem material as well as advice and suggestions in the text. This pioneering book (now in its 10th edition) made publishing history. It was a truly monumental classic, and for many years was a perennial leader in its field and held the American publishers record as the best selling of all college textbooks. This text is attributed to giving great impetus to the McGraw-Hill Publishing Company, as well as helping Martin Foss, who later became President of the company.

As an author of textbooks, Professor French is perhaps unequalled by anyone else in his field in the world. The following quotation is taken from the Ohio State University Monthly, February 1935, p. 148: "Not only is he famous as the 'father of the Stadium' idea, but his textbook, A Manual of Engineering Drawing, has taken the name of Professor Thomas E. French, Mech. E., '95 into 400 colleges and universities throughout the world. It is the most widely used text on engineering extant." The fifth edition of this book is now used by engineering students in schools throughout the world, and has been translated into several different languages.

This book became a best seller for the McGraw Hill publishing company, and reportedly its sales kept the company from bankruptcy during the depression.

Films 
Starting with the Seventh Edition in 1947, 16mm sound motion picture films were created to complement the instruction found in the textbook. This practice continued through the Eleventh Edition.

Text-Films for the Seventh Edition:

McGraw-Hill Text-Films For Engineering Drawing (10 min, According to Plan: Introduction to Engineering Drawing), For Chap. 1

McGraw-Hill Text-Films For Engineering Drawing (20 min, Orthographic Projection), For Chaps. 6 and 7

McGraw-Hill Text-Films For Engineering Drawing (20 min, Auxiliary Views: Single Auxiliaries), For Chap. 8

McGraw-Hill Text-Films For Engineering Drawing (15 min, Auxiliary Views: Double Auxiliaries), For Chap. 8

McGraw-Hill Text-Films For Engineering Drawing (15 min, Sections and Conventions), For Chap. 9

McGraw-Hill Text-Films For Engineering Drawing (15 min, Drawings and the Shop), For Chap. 10

McGraw-Hill Text-Films For Engineering Drawing (Silent filmstrip, Dimensioning Techniques), For Chaps. 11 and 12

McGraw-Hill Text-Films For Engineering Drawing (20 min, Selection of Dimensions), For Chaps. 11 and 12

Text-Films for the Eighth Edition:

McGraw-Hill Text-Films For Engineering Drawing (10 min, According to Plan: Introduction to Engineering Drawing), For Chap. 1

McGraw-Hill Text-Films For Engineering Drawing (20 min, Orthographic Projection), For Chaps. 6, 7, 8, and 9

McGraw-Hill Text-Films For Engineering Drawing (20 min, Auxiliary Views: Single Auxiliaries), For Chap. 10

McGraw-Hill Text-Films For Engineering Drawing (15 min, Auxiliary Views: Double Auxiliaries), For Chap. 11

McGraw-Hill Text-Films For Engineering Drawing (15 min, Sections and Conventions), For Chap. 13

McGraw-Hill Text-Films For Engineering Drawing (18 min, Developments, For Chap. 15

McGraw-Hill Text-Films For Engineering Drawing (12 min, Pictorial Sketching), For Chap. 18

McGraw-Hill Text-Films For Engineering Drawing (15 min, The Drawings and the Shop), For Chap. 19

McGraw-Hill Text-Films For Engineering Drawing (Silent filmstrip, Dimensioning Techniques), For Chaps. 20 and 21

McGraw-Hill Text-Films For Engineering Drawing (20 min, Selection of Dimensions), For Chaps. 20 and 21

Text-Films for the Ninth, Tenth, and Eleventh Editions:

McGraw-Hill Text-Films For Engineering Drawing (9 min, According to Plan), For Chap. 1

McGraw-Hill Text-Films For Engineering Drawing (18 min, Orthographic Projection), For Chap. 5

McGraw-Hill Text-Films For Engineering Drawing (11 min, Pictorial Sketching), For Chap. 6

McGraw-Hill Text-Films For Engineering Drawing (23 min, Auxiliary Views: Single Auxiliaries), For Chap. 7

McGraw-Hill Text-Films For Engineering Drawing (13 min, Auxiliary Views: Double Auxiliaries), For Chap. 7

McGraw-Hill Text-Films For Engineering Drawing (15 min, Sections and Conventions), For Chap. 8

McGraw-Hill Text-Films For Engineering Drawing (11 min, Simple Developments), For Chap. 9

McGraw-Hill Text-Films For Engineering Drawing (11 min, Oblique Cones and Transition Developments), For Chap. 9

McGraw-Hill Text-Films For Engineering Drawing (15 min, Drawings and the Shop), For Chap. 10

McGraw-Hill Text-Films For Engineering Drawing (18 min, Selection of Dimensions), For Chap. 11

Accompanying Books 
The success of the textbook enabled others to write accompanying books of additional practice questions or problems.

Quiz Questions (Russ), 1943 (Accompany Sixth Edition)

Quiz Questions (Russ), 1948 (Accompany Seventh Edition)

Quiz Questions (Russ), 1953 (Accompany Eighth Edition)

Keyed to A Manual of Engineering Drawing for Students and Draftsmen and Fundamentals of Engineering Drawing:

Problems in engineering drawing (Levens, Edstrom), 1944

Problems in engineering drawing (Levens, Edstrom), 1945

Problems in engineering drawing (Levens, Edstrom), 1947

Problems in engineering drawing (Levens, Edstrom), 1951 (Series III; keyed to 7th edition)

Problems in engineering drawing (Levens, Edstrom), 1960 (Series V; keyed to 9th edition and 1st edition)

Engineering and Graphic Technology Problems Book (Rogers), 1978 (keyed to Twelfth Edition)

Engineering and Graphic Technology Problems Book II (Rogers), 1988 (keyed to Thirteenth Edition)

Engineering and Graphic Technology Problems Book III (Rogers), 1993 (keyed to Fourteenth Edition)

Publication Data 
This publication data was derived from the copyright information published in the front of each book, except where noted.

First Edition 
289 pages (includes Index) - 35,000 copies

LCCN 11-020537

Second Edition 
329 pages (includes Appendix and Index) - 108,000 copies

LCCN 18-016246

Third Edition 
409 pages (includes Appendix and Index) - 96,000 copies

LCCN 24-012758

Fourth Edition 
466 pages (includes Appendix and Index) - 106,000 copies

LCCN 29-013849

Fifth Edition 
481 pages (includes Appendix and Index) - 148,000 copies

LCCN 35-027219

Sixth Edition 
622 pages (includes Appendix and Index) - 439,700 copies

LCCN 41-008971

In 1944, the War Department used this textbook as one of their Education Manuals (EM 961)

Seventh Edition 
694 pages (includes Appendix and Index) - 302,989 copies

LCCN 47-031042

Eighth Edition 
715 pages (includes Appendix and Index) - 408,982 copies

LCCN 52-013455

Ninth Edition 
592 pages; 118 Appendix pages; 16 Index pages

LCCN 59-015458

Tenth Edition 
701 pages; 143 Appendix pages; 16 Index pages

LCCN 65-028814

Eleventh Edition 
787 pages; 143 Appendix pages; 16 Index pages

; LCCN 70-038135

Twelfth Edition 
799 pages; 137 Appendix pages; 14 Index pages

; LCCN 77-014431

Thirteenth Edition 
737 pages (includes Appendix and Index)

; LCCN 85-016605

Fourteenth Edition 
745 pages (includes Appendix and Index)

; LCCN 92-036219

References 

Engineering education in the United States
Engineering textbooks
McGraw-Hill books